Cyphostemma is a flowering plant genus in the family Vitaceae, with around 250 species distributed throughout the tropics and subtropics. These species are caudiciform and used to belong to the genus Cissus. The genus name comes from Greek kyphos, meaning hump, and stemma, meaning garland.

Within the Vitaceae, Cyphostemma is most closely related to Cayratia and Tetrastigma. All species of Cyphostemma were once included in the genus Cissus but are now considered to be distinct.

Distribution
They originate from Northeast Africa to southern Arabia, in particular from Madagascar through to Indochina.

Species

C. abercornense Wild & R.B.Drumm.
C. adamii Desc.
C. adenanthum (Fresen.) Desc.
C. adenocarpum (Gilg & M.Brandt) Desc.
C. adenocaule (Steud. ex A.Rich.) Desc. ex Wild & R.B.Drumm.
C. adenocephalum (Gilg & M.Brandt) Desc.
C. adenopodum (Sprague) Desc.
C. agnus-castus (Planch.) Desc.
C. allophyloides (Gilg & M.Brandt) Desc.
C. alnifolium (Schweinf. ex Planch.) Desc.
C. amplexicaule Desc.
C. anatomicum (C.A.Sm.) Wild & R.B.Drumm.
C. ankirihitrensis Desc.
C. auriculata (Roxb.) P.Singh & B.V.Shetty
C. auriculatum (Roxb.) P.Singh & B.V.Shetty
C. bainesii (Hook.f.) Desc.
C. bambuseti (Gilg & M.Brandt) Desc. ex Wild & R.B.Drumm.
C. barbosae Wild & R.B.Drumm.
C. betiforme (Chiov.) Vollesen
C. bidgoodiae Verdc.
C. biternatum (Baker) Desc.
C. boranense Vollesen
C. bororense (Klotzsch) Desc. ex Wild & R.B.Drumm.
C. braunii (Gilg & M.Brandt) Desc.
C. brieyi (De Wild.) Compère
C. buchananii (Planch.) Desc. ex Wild & R.B.Drumm.
C. bullatum (Gilg & M.Brandt) Desc.
C. burgeri Vollesen
C. cabui (Dewit) Desc.
C. camerounense Desc.
C. chevalieri (Gilg & M.Brandt) Desc.
C. chloroleucum (Welw.ex Baker) Desc. ex Wild & R.B.Drumm.
C. chrysadenium (Gilg) Desc.
C. cirrhosum (Thunb.) Desc. ex Wild & R.B.Drumm.
C. congestum (Baker) Desc. ex Wild & R.B.Drumm.
C. congoense (auct.) Desc.
C. connivens (Lam.) Desc.
C. conradsii (Gilg & M.Brandt) Desc.
C. cornigera Desc.
C. cornus-africani Thulin
C. crassiusculum (Baker) Desc.
C. crinitum (Planch.) Desc.
C. cristigera Desc.
C. crithmifolium (Chiov.) Desc.
C. crotalarioides (Planch.) Desc. ex Wild & R.B.Drumm.
C. cryptoglandulosum Verdc.
C. cuneatum (Gilg & M.Brandt) Desc.
C. currorii (Hook.f.) Desc.
C. curvipodum (Baker) Desc.
C. cymosum (Schumach. & Thonn.) Desc.
C. cyphopetalum (Fresen.) Desc. ex Wild & R.B.Drumm.
C. dasycarpum Verdc.
C. dasypleurum (C.A.Sm.) J.J.M.Van der Merwe
C. decurrens (Gilg & M.Brandt) Desc.
C. degraeri (Dewit) Desc.
C. delphinensis Desc.
C. dembianensis (Chiov.) Vollesen
C. descoingsii Lavie
C. desenfansii (Dewit) Desc.
C. digitatum (Forssk.) Desc.
C. duparquettii (Planch.) Desc.
C. dysocarpum (Gilg & M.Brandt) Desc.
C. echinocarpa Desc.
C. egregium (Gilg) Desc.
C. elephantopus Desc.
C. elisabethvilleanum (Dewit) Desc. ex Wild & R.B.Drumm.
C. eminii (Gilg) Desc.
C. engleri (Gilg) Desc.
C. erythreae (Gilg & M.Brandt) Desc.
C. erythrocephalum (Gilg & M.Brandt) Desc.
C. feddeanum (Gilg & M.Brandt) Desc.
C. flavicans (Baker) Desc.
C. flaviflorum (Sprague) Desc.
C. fragariifolium (Bojer ex Planch.) Desc.
C. fugosioides (Gilg) Desc. ex Wild & R.B.Drumm.
C. gigantophyllum (Gilg & M.Brandt) Desc. ex Wild & R.B.Drumm.
C. gillettii (De Wild. & T.Durand) Desc.
C. glandulosissimum (Gilg & M.Brandt) Desc. ex Wild & R.B.Drumm.
C. glanduloso-pilosa Desc.
C. gracillimum (Werderm.) Desc.
C. grahamii Verdc.
C. grandistipulatum (Gilg & M.Brandt) Desc.
C. graniticum (Wild & R.B.Drumm.) Wild & R.B.Drumm.
C. greenwayi Verdc.
C. greveanum Desc.
C. griseorubrum (Gilg & M.Brandt) Desc.
C. hardyi Retief
C. haumanii (Dewit) Desc.
C. hereroense (Schinz) Desc. ex Wild & R.B.Drumm.
C. heterotrichum (Gilg & R.E.Fr.) Desc. ex Wild & R.B.Drumm.
C. hildebrandtii (Gilg) Desc. ex Wild & R.B.Drumm.
C. hispidiflorum (C.A.Sm.) J.J.M.Van der Merwe
C. homblei (De Wild.) Desc.
C. horombense Desc.
C. huillense (Exell & Mendonça) Desc.
C. humile (N.E.Br.) Desc. ex Wild & R.B.Drumm.
C. hypargyreum (Gilg) Desc.
C. hypoleucum (Harv.) Desc. ex Wild & R.B.Drumm.
C. jaegeri (Gilg & M.Brandt) Desc. ex Wild & R.B.Drumm.
C. jiguu Verdc.
C. johannis (Exell & Mendonça) Desc.
C. juttae (Dinter & Gilg) Desc.
C. kaniamae (Mullend. ex Dewit) Desc.
C. kapiriense (Dewit) Desc.
C. keilii (Gilg & M.Brandt) Desc.
C. kibweziense Verdc.
C. kilimandscharicum (Gilg) Desc. ex Wild & R.B.Drumm.
C. kirkianum (Planch.) Desc. ex Wild & R.B.Drumm.
C. kiwakishiense (Dewit) Desc.
C. knittelii (Gilg) Desc.
C. kundelunguense Malaisse
C. lageniflorum (Gilg & M.Brandt) Desc.
C. lanigerum (Harv.) Desc. ex Wild & R.B.Drumm.
C. laza Desc.
C. leandrii Desc.
C. ledermannii (Gilg & M.Brandt) Desc.
C. lelyi (Hutch.) Desc.
C. lentianum (Volkens & Gilg) Desc.
C. letouzeyanum Desc.
C. leucorufescens Desc.
C. leucotrichum (Gilg & M.Brandt) Desc.
C. libenii (Dewit) Desc.
C. loandense (Gilg & M.Brandt) Desc.
C. lovemorei Willd. & R.B.Drumm.
C. luteum (Exell & Mendonça) Desc.
C. lynesii (Dewit) Desc. ex Wild & R.B.Drumm.
C. macrocarpa Desc.
C. manambovensis Desc.
C. manikense (De Wild.) Desc. ex Wild & R.B.Drumm.
C. mannii (Baker) Desc.
C. mappia (Lam.) Galet
C. maranguense (Gilg) Desc.
C. marlothii (Dinter & Gilg) Desc.
C. marunguense (Dewit) Desc.
C. masukuense (Baker) Desc. ex Wild & R.B.Drumm.
C. megabotrys (Collett & Hemsl.) B.V.Shetty
C. meyeri-johannis (Gilg & M.Brandt) Verdc.
C. michelii (Dewit) Desc.
C. micradenium (Gilg & M.Brandt) Desc.
C. microdipterum (Baker) Desc.
C. migiurtinorum (Chiov.) Desc.
C. mildbraedii (Gilg & M.Brandt) Desc. ex Wild & R.B.Drumm.
C. milleri Wild & R.B.Drumm.
C. molle (Steud. ex A.Rich.) Desc.
C. montagnacii Desc.
C. montanum Wild & R.B.Drumm.
C. muhuluense (Mildbr.) Desc.
C. nanellum (Gilg & R.E.Fr.) Desc. ex Wild & R.B.Drumm.
C. natalitium (Szyszyl.) J.J.M.Van der Merwe
C. nigroglandulosum (Gilg & M.Brandt) Desc.
C. niveum (Hochst. ex Schweinf.) Desc.
C. njegerre (Gilg & Strauss) Desc.
C. obovato-oblongum (De Wild.) Desc. ex Wild & R.B.Drumm.
C. odontadenium (Gilg) Desc.
C. oleraceum (Bolus) J.J.M.Van der Merwe
C. omburense (Gilg & M.Brandt) Desc.
C. ornatum (A.Chev. ex Hutch. & Dalziel) Desc.
C. ouakense Desc.
C. overlaetii (Dewit) Desc.
C. oxyphyllum (A.Rich.) Vollesen
C. pachyanthum (Gilg & M.Brandt) Desc.
C. pachypus Desc.
C. pannosum Vollesen
C. passargei (Gilg & M.Brandt) Desc.
C. paucidentatum (Klotzsch) Desc. ex Wild & R.B.Drumm.
C. pendulum (Welw. ex Baker) Desc..
C. perforatum (Louis ex Dewit) Desc.
C. phyllomicron (Chiov.) Desc.
C. pobeguinianum Desc.
C. princeae (Gilg & M.Brandt) Desc. ex Wild & R.B.Drumm.
C. pruriens (Welw. ex Baker) Desc.
C. pseudoburgeri Verdc.
C. pseudonjegerre (Gilg & M.Brandt) Desc.
C. pseudorhodesiae (Dewit) Desc.
C. pseudosesquipedale Verdc.
C. pseudoupembaense (Dewit) Desc.
C. puberulum (C.A.Sm.) Wild & R.B.Drumm.
C. pumilum Desc.
C. quinatum (Dryand.) Desc. ex Wild & R.B.Drumm.
C. rhodesiae (Gilg & M.Brandt) Desc. ex Wild & R.B.Drumm.
C. richardsiae Wild & R.B.Drumm.
C. ringoetii (De Wild.) Desc.
C. rivae (Gilg) Desc.
C. robsonii Wild & R.B.Drumm.
C. robynsii (Dewit) Desc.
C. roseiglandulosum Desc.
C. rotundistipulatum Wild & R.B.Drumm.
C. rowlandii (Gilg & M.Brandt) Desc.
C. ruacanense (Exell & Mendonça) Desc.
C. rubroglandulosum Retief & B.-E.van Wyk
C. rubromarginatum (Gilg & M.Brandt) Desc.
C. rubrosetosum (Gilg & M.Brandt) Desc.
C. rupicola (Gilg & M.Brandt) Desc.
C. rutilans Desc.
C. sakalavensis Desc.
C. sanctuarium-selousii Verdc.
C. sarcospathulum (Chiov.) Desc.
C. saxicola (Gilg & R.E.Fr.) Desc. ex Wild & R.B.Drumm.
C. saxicolum (Gilg & R.E.Fr.) Desc. ex Wild & R.B.Drumm.
C. scarlatinum (Gilg & M.Brandt) Desc.
C. schimperi (Hochst. ex A.Rich.) Desc.
C. schlechteri (Gilg & M.Brandt) Desc. ex Wild & R.B.Drumm.
C. schliebenii (Mildbr.) Desc.
C. segmentatum (C.A.Sm.) J.J.M.Van der Merwe
C. seitzianum (Gilg & M.Brandt) Desc.
C. septemfoliatum Wild & R.B.Drumm.
C. serjanioides (Planch.) Desc.
C. serpens (Hochst. ex A.Rich.) Desc.
C. sesquipedale (Gilg) Desc.
C. sessilifolium (Dewit) Desc.
C. setosum (Roxb.) Alston
C. shinyangense Verdc.
C. simplicifolium A.Björnstad
C. simulans (C.A.Sm.) Wild & R.B.Drumm.
C. sokodense (Gilg & M.Brandt) Desc.
C. spinosopilosum (Gilg & M.Brandt) Desc.
C. stefanianum (Chiov.) Desc.
C. stefaninianum (Chiov.) Desc.
C. stegosaurus Verdc.
C. stenolobum (Welw. ex Baker) Desc. ex Wild & R.B.Drumm.
C. stenopodum (Gilg ex Gilg & M.Brandt) Desc.
C. stipulaceum (Baker) Desc.
C. strigosum (Dewit) Desc.
C. subciliatum (Baker) Desc. ex Wild & R.B.Drumm.
C. sulcatum (C.A.Sm.) J.J.M.Van der Merwe
C. taborense Verdc.
C. tenuissimum (Gilg & R.E.Fr.) Desc. ex Wild & R.B.Drumm.
C. ternatomultifidum (Chiov.) Desc.
C. ternatum (Forssk.) Desc.
C. thomasii (Gilg & M.Brandt) Desc.
C. tisserantii Desc.
C. trachyphyllum (Werderm.) Desc. ex Wild & R.B.Drumm.
C. trilobata (Lam.) M.R.Almeida
C. triumfettoides (Gilg & M.Brandt) Desc.
C. tsaratananensis Desc.
C. ukerewense (Gilg) Desc.
C. upembaense (Dewit) Desc.
C. urophyllum (Gilg & M.Brandt) Desc.
C. uter (Exell & Mendonça) Desc.
C. uwanda Verdc.
C. vandenbergheae Malaisse & Matamba
C. vandenbrandeanum (Dewit) Desc. ex Wild & R.B.Drumm.
C. vanderbenii (Dewit) Desc.
C. vanmeelii (Lawalrée) Wild & R.B.Drumm.
C. vezensis Desc.
C. villosicaule Verdc.
C. villosiglandulosum (Werderm.) Desc.
C. violaceoglandulosum (Gilg) Desc.
C. viscosum (Gilg & R.E.Fr.) Desc. ex Wild & R.B.Drumm.
C. vogelii (Hook.f.) Desc.
C. vollesenii Verdc.
C. waterlotii (A.Chev.) Desc.
C. wilmsii (Gilg & M.Brandt) Desc.
C. wittei (Staner) Wild & R.B.Drumm.
C. woodii (Gilg & M.Brandt) Desc.
C. zanzibaricum Verdc.
C. zechianum (Gilg & M.Brandt) Desc.
C. zimmermannii Verdc.
C. zombense (Baker) Desc. ex Wild & R.B.Drumm.

 List sources :

References

External links

 
Vitaceae genera